Banham Poultry is a British poultry producer, based in Attleborough, Norfolk, with an annual turnover of £100 million. Its chairman was Michael Foulger, who is also deputy chairman of Norwich City F.C.

In 2018, the company was put up for sale, ; a few days later, two pest-control contractors were found dead near the Banham site.

The company has more than 1,000 employees. The company was bought by Chesterfield Poultry in October 2018.

In late October, 2021, Banham Poultry was bought by the Boparan Private Office, owner of poultry processor 2 Sisters Food Group and Bernard Matthews.

References

Poultry companies
Meat companies of the United Kingdom
Food brands of the United Kingdom
Companies based in Norfolk
Food and drink companies of the United Kingdom
Poultry farming in the United Kingdom